"Women of Ireland" is an instrumental piece by musician Mike Oldfield, originally released in 1996. It is a version of the folk song, "Mná na hÉireann" (Women of Ireland), credited as traditional but actually written by Seán Ó Riada.

Originally from the 1996 album Voyager, it also appeared on the compilation XXV: The Essential. The single release "Women of Ireland XXV" includes two mixes of the song along with a reel tune, similar to the ending pieces of the first two Tubular Bells albums.

Charts

Track listing

CD single (Germany, 1996) 
 "Women of Ireland" (edit) - 3:37
 "Women of Ireland" (12" Lurker mix – 9:10
 "Women of Ireland" (Transient mix) – 9:38

CD single (1997) 
 "Women of Ireland" (Lurker edit) (Traditional) – 3:37
 "Women of Ireland" (Album version) (Traditional) – 6:27
 "Mike's Reel" (Mike Oldfield) – 3:51

The Lurker edit remix is by Henry Jackman and George Shilling.

Remix CD single (1997) 
 "Women of Ireland" (Lurker edit) (Traditional) – 3:37
 "Women of Ireland" (System 7 12" mix) (Traditional) – 9:00
 "Women of Ireland" (12" Lurker mix (Traditional)– 9:08
 "Women of Ireland" (Transient mix) (Traditional) – 9:37

References 
 

Mike Oldfield songs
1997 singles
Year of song unknown
Warner Records singles
Warner Music Group singles